The Atlas Underground Flood is the third collaborative album by American rock musician Tom Morello. The album was released on December 3, 2021, and features guest appearances from San Holo, Barns Courtney, Nathaniel Rateliff, Jim Jones, Chipotle Joe, X Ambassadors, Alex Lifeson, Kirk Hammett, Dr. Fresch, Manchester Orchestra,  Andrew McMahon In The Wilderness, BreakCode, Ben Harper,  IDLES, Jim James, and Rodrigo y Gabriela.

Track listing

References

2021 albums
Tom Morello albums
Mom + Pop Music albums